Jukka Kuvaja (born 4 November 1953) is a Finnish skier. He competed in the Nordic combined events at the 1972 Winter Olympics, the 1976 Winter Olympics and the 1980 Winter Olympics.

References

External links
 

1953 births
Living people
Finnish male Nordic combined skiers
Olympic Nordic combined skiers of Finland
Nordic combined skiers at the 1972 Winter Olympics
Nordic combined skiers at the 1976 Winter Olympics
Nordic combined skiers at the 1980 Winter Olympics
People from Asikkala
Sportspeople from Päijät-Häme
20th-century Finnish people